The Texas FFA Association (Future Farmers of America) is one of fifty-two state associations of the National FFA Organization. It was the 34th state organization to be chartered, in 1929. As of the 2016–2017 year, it had the largest membership enrollment. It also has the largest number of chapters in the organization. It has 115,941 members and 1,032 chapters. The state is led by a team of 12 state officers representing each of the 12 areas of the Association.

Leadership
The Texas FFA Association State Officer Team consists of twelve members to serve as officers for a year running from the state convention in July to the following convention. There are ten vice-presidents, one first vice-president, and one president. The twelve individuals make up the board of student officers. The responsibilities of an officer for the Texas FFA are to serve as a representative of the association, represent the members at the Texas FFA Board of Directors meetings, and carry out the day-to-day operations outlined in the Texas FFA Program of Activities. In order to run for state office a student must either be a graduating senior from high school, or be no more than one year removed from high school, hold the Lone Star FFA degree, and be willing to contribute many hours of service to the association.

Texas FFA State Officers

2022-2023

President: Windsor Godfrey - Area IV, Bryson
 
First Vice-President: Bryce Fisher - Area XII, Florence

Area I Vice-President: Campbell Offield, Plainview

Area II Vice-President: Zoee Nolan, Seminole

Area III Vice-President: Logan Jaure, Jersey Village

Area V Vice-President: Austin Blagg, Frisco Memorial 

Area VI Vice-President: Joseph Nelson, Gilmer

Area VII Vice-President: Thomas Egbert, Canyon-New Braunfels

Area VIII Vice-President: Ty Williams, Dawson

Area IX Vice-President: Brandon French, Cushing

Area X Vice-President: Nathan Atkinson, Calallen

Area XI Vice-President: Laura Beth James, Flatonia

Texas FFA State Staff 
 Jennifer Jackson, Executive Director of the Texas FFA
 Gwenn Cain, Membership Services Coordinator
 Tammy Glascock, SAE Coordinator
 Carolee Frampton, Budget and Finance Coordinator
 Ashley Dunkerley, Communications Coordinator
 Jordan Blount, Student Recognition and Scholarship Coordinator
 Peggy Georg, Leadership Development Coordinator

External links
 Texas FFA
 Texas FFA Collegiate Assoc.
  Texas Young Farmers Assoc. of the Texas FFA
  Vocational agricultural Teacher Assoc of Texas

Youth organizations based in Texas
National FFA Organization